Wijchen is a municipality and a town in the province of Gelderland, in the eastern part of the Netherlands.

Population centres 
Number of residents per population centre per 12 December 2009:

Source: Statistics Netherlands

The population centre Woezik (3,820 residents on 1 January 2005) and the township Laak are statistically included in Wijchen.

Neighbourhoods 
Neighbourhoods in Wijchen include:
Centre: Kloosterakker
Wijchen-Oost: Valendries, Oosterweg and Uilenboom.
Woezik: Veenhof and Saltshof.
Wijchen-Noord.
Achterlo: Homberg, Heilige Stoel and Kraaijenberg.
Wijchen-West: Blauwe Hof and Aalsburg.
Wijchen-Zuid: Abersland, Diepvoorde, Huissteden, Hoogmeer, De Ververt, De Geer, Elsland, De Weertjes, De Grippen, Zesakkers, Zevendreef, Sluiskamp, Oudelaan, and Kronenland.
Kerkeveld: De Gamert, De Meren, Diemenwei, De Flier, De Lingert.
Huurlingsedam.

Streets in most neighbourhoods are numbered instead of named. This is not common practice in the Netherlands, therefore the street numbers are included in the house numbering. E.g. someone living in Abersland, 11th street, house #05 will usually use Abersland 1105 in his address.

Wijchen Castle (town hall) 
Parts of Wijchen Castle (Kasteel Wijchen in Dutch) date from the 14th century, but it took its current Mannerist form in the years 1609–1629. It is surrounded by a moat and used to serve as the town hall. Currently, the town hall is down the road, while the castle is only used for important meetings.

Notable residents 

 Ine Lamers (born 1954) photographer and video installation artist
 Ronald van der Kemp (born 1964) fashion designer
 Arjen Thonen (born 1992), DJ and music producer better known as SWACQ[NL]

Sport 
 Fred Rutten (born 1962) a football coach and a former footballer with 317 caps
 Ralf Elshof (born 1962) cyclist, competed at the 1984 Summer Olympics
 Roy Makaay (born 1975) ) football manager and former footballer with 526 caps
 Claudia van Thiel (born 1977), volleyball player, competed at the 1996 Summer Olympics
 Lieke Klaus (born 1989) BMX racer

Gallery

References

External links 

 

 
Municipalities of Gelderland
Populated places in Gelderland